Jeff Willette (born April 29, 1971, in Big Rapids, Michigan) is an American computer graphics 3D animator. In 2008, Willette was nominated for a Visual Effects Society Award in the category of Outstanding Animated Character in a Live Action Broadcast Program or Commercial (shared with Matthew Hackett, Sean Andrew Faden, and Denis Gauthier; and in 2010 he was nominated for a Visual Effects Society Award in the category of Outstanding Compositing in a Broadcast Program or Commercial.

His numerous film and television credits for visual effects and computer animation includes:
 A Little Bit of Heaven (2011)
 The Sorcerer's Apprentice (2010)
 National Treasure: Book of Secrets (2007)
 Surf's Up (2007)
 The Adventures of Sharkboy and Lavagirl in 3-D (2005)
 Carnivàle (2003)
 Cast Away (2000)
 What Lies Beneath (2000)
In 2017, Jeff joined Venice, CA - based boutique Timber as Digital Effects Supervisor.

References

External links 
 

1971 births
Living people
People from Big Rapids, Michigan
American animators